Josef Schnitter (Yosif Shniter; 16 October 1852–26 April 1914) was a Czech–Bulgarian architect, engineer and geodesist credited with shaping the modern appearance of Plovdiv, Bulgaria's second-largest city.

Schnitter was born in the small town of Nový Bydžov in Bohemia, Austrian Empire (today in the Czech Republic). He graduated from the University of Technology's Faculty of Construction in the imperial capital Vienna and then moved to the Russian Empire, where he converted to the Eastern Orthodox Church. Schnitter arrived in Bulgaria during the Russo-Turkish War of 1877–1878 and assisted the Imperial Russian Army as an engineer, designing the pontoon bridges used in the crossing of the Danube and the fortification equipment employed by the Russians in the Siege of Plevna. Schnitter was injured at Pleven and received a sabre from General Eduard Totleben, who commanded the siege, as a recognition of his contribution to the siege's success.

Even before the Treaty of San Stefano was signed on 3 March 1878 and Bulgaria was liberated from Ottoman rule, Schnitter was dispatched to Plovdiv by the Russians. He settled in the city, which was the capital of autonomous Eastern Rumelia until the Unification of Bulgaria in 1885, and, after a brief private practice, served as Plovdiv's head architect and municipal chief of engineering from 1878 until his death in 1914.

Schnitter was married to Elisabeth Maria Friederike Baumann from Windsheim in Germany who was staying in Plovdiv's Old Town en route to Istanbul. According to the story, he met his future wife when the crumbs she threw out of her window landed on Schnitter, who was touring the buildings he had constructed. His best man was Slovene scholar Anton Bezenšek who spent two decades teaching in Plovdiv. The architect acquired Bulgarian citizenship in 1906. Josef Schnitter died of bronchopneumonia in 1914; he got sick while overseeing the repair of the city water conduit. He was interred in the Plovdiv Central Cemetery.

Maria Schnitter, head of the Plovdiv University's Faculty of Philosophy and History, is his great granddaughter. In 2006, Josef Schnitter was posthumously declared an honorary citizen of Plovdiv and in early 2009, plans were announced to erect a monument to the architect in the city; the monument will be sculptured by Tsvyatko Siromashki. A street in Plovdiv is also named after the architect.

Works 

His other projects include:
 bell tower of Saint Demetrius' Church
 bell tower of Saint Petka's Church
 bell tower of the Holy Mother of God Church (1880–1881)
 Saint George's Church (1881–1883)
 Saints Cyril and Methodius' Church (1882–1884)
 the new church in Batak
 the current Neo-Renaissance City Art Gallery building (former Main Girls' School, 1879–1881)
 the current Museum of Natural History building (former Plovdiv municipality building, 1880)
 the house where writer Ivan Vazov lived
 Yoakim Gruev's house
 Dragan Manchov's house (1887)
 Sveshtarovi brothers' house (1888)
 Ivan Gerdzhikov's house (1890)
 Ivan Andonov's house (1891)
 Orozdi Bak commercial house building (1896–1897)
 Metropol Hotel
 Konstantin Naydenovich's house (1905–1906)
 Plovdiv municipality engineering department building

Gallery

References 

1852 births
1914 deaths
People from Nový Bydžov
Czech architects
Bulgarian architects
Geodesists
Converts to Eastern Orthodoxy
Bulgarian people of Czech descent
History of Plovdiv
Bulgarian engineers
TU Wien alumni